Rambaut is a surname. Notable people with the surname include: 

Andrew Rambaut, British evolutionary biologist
Arthur Rambaut (1859–1923), Irish astronomer
Daniel Rambaut (1865–1937), Irish psychiatrist and rugby union player